Scopula kuldschaensis is a moth of the family Geometridae. It was first described by Sergei Alphéraky in 1883. It is found in China, Kyrghyzstan and Kazakhstan.

Subspecies
Scopula kuldschaensis kuldschaensis (China: Sinkiang, Tien-Shan mountains)
Scopula kuldschaensis negrita (Thierry-Mieg, 1905) (Issyk-kul)

References

Moths described in 1883
kuldschaensis
Moths of Asia